Chromatophania is a genus of bristle flies in the family Tachinidae. There are about five described species in Chromatophania.

Species
These five species belong to the genus Chromatophania:
 Chromatophania distinguenda Villeneuve, 1913 c g
 Chromatophania emdeni Mesnil, 1952 c g
 Chromatophania fenestrata Villeneuve, 1913 c g
 Chromatophania picta (Wiedemann, 1830) c g
 Chromatophania versicolor (Karsch, 1879) c g
Data sources: i = ITIS, c = Catalogue of Life, g = GBIF, b = Bugguide.net

References

Further reading

External links

 
 

Tachinidae